Michael Ryan Hoyos (born August 2, 1991) is an Argentinian-American soccer player who currently plays for Barcelona S.C.

Club

Youth
Hoyos attended Santa Margarita Catholic High School in Rancho Santa Margarita, California where he played soccer. He played club soccer with Irvine Strikers, coached by Don Ebert. He moved to Argentina together with his mother at age fifteen, and soon had a successful trial with Estudiantes de La Plata and was placed into the club's youth system.

Estudiantes
Hoyos debuted with the first team in a January 2010 non-official match against Boca Juniors. He scored on a solo run from midfield, earning a spot on the first team bench. On January 29, 2010, he made his league debut as a substitute against Arsenal de Sarandí.

OFI
Hoyos moved to Superleague Greece club OFI Crete on July 8, 2013.

International
After managers for both the USA and Argentina national teams expressed interest in having Hoyos attend their Under-20 camps, Hoyos was part of the sparring roster that practiced with the Argentina national team during the South Africa 2010 FIFA World Cup, and was called for the Argentina Under-20. In his international debut on July 27, 2010 against Uruguay, in Asunción, he scored the winning goal. Hoyos also scored against Uruguay in the 2011 edition of the South American Under-20 tournament.

Personal
His parents were from Don Torcuato in Buenos Aires province. Hoyos, who holds dual USA-Argentine citizenship, is the third USA player to play in the Argentine top league, after Renato Corsi, who played for Argentinos Juniors and other teams in the 1980s, and Bryan Gerzicich, who played for Arsenal in 2006. His younger brother, Kevin, is also American and currently plays in the Estudiantes youth system as a striker.

On April 4, 2011, Hoyos was involved in a car accident when his car struck a tree at the González roundabout in the outskirts of La Plata. After a few days in intensive care, Hoyos was released April 19 and started undergoing physical therapy to rejoin the team.

Honours
Estudiantes
Argentine Primera División (1): 2010 Apertura

References

External links
 Argentine Primera statistics at Fútbol XXI  
 Inferiores Platenses 
 

1991 births
Living people
People from Fountain Valley, California
American people of Argentine descent
American emigrants to Argentina
Citizens of Argentina through descent
Argentine footballers
Argentine Primera División players
Super League Greece players
Ecuadorian Serie A players
Estudiantes de La Plata footballers
Boca Unidos footballers
C.D. Cuenca footballers
OFI Crete F.C. players
Guayaquil City F.C. footballers
L.D.U. Quito footballers
Association football midfielders
Footballers at the 2011 Pan American Games
Soccer players from California
Argentina youth international footballers
Pan American Games medalists in football
Pan American Games silver medalists for Argentina
Medalists at the 2011 Pan American Games
Expatriate footballers in Greece
Expatriate footballers in Ecuador